Heyran is a cluster of three villages in the western Alborz mountain range, within Astara County of Gilan Province in far northwestern Iran.

Geography
The three villages are:
Heyran-e Olya, or Upper-Heyran
Heyran-e Vosta, or Middle-Heyran
Heyran-e Sofla, or Lower-Heyran

Winters are cold and snowy; summers are cool.

Tourism
Heyran is one of the most famous tourist destinations in Iran, due to the beautiful and accessible scenery.

Because of its desirable microclimate at summertime, many villas have been built in the neighborhood. The main road is crowded on the weekends.

The Heyran Gondola lift is above the villages, at a higher altitude in the Alborz.

See also
 Laton Waterfall

References

External links
 Tishineh.com: Heyran photos gallery

Astara County
Alborz (mountain range)
Tourist attractions in Gilan Province